Aea or Aia or Aeaea or Aiaia was a town in Malis in ancient Thessaly. It was mentioned by Sophocles. It was presumably a harbour town, and its site has not been located.

References

Populated places in ancient Thessaly
Former populated places in Greece
Malis (region)
Lost ancient cities and towns